Sean Cameron Michael (born 24 December 1969) is a South African actor, writer and singer. A native English speaker, he is also fluent in Afrikaans.

Early life
Michael was born in Cape Town, South Africa. He became interested in acting at the age of twelve, after appearing in several stage musicals.

While in school, he studied drama with Rita Maas-Phillips (RADA). After completing high school, Michael did his two years compulsory National Service as an infantryman in the South African Defence Force in Potchefstroom. After a number of part-time jobs (including being a waiter and a chef) he decided to become a full-time actor and singer.

Acting career
Over the past three decades, Michael has performed in more than 100 international television series, shorts and feature films and recently received a 2022 SAFTA South African Film and Television Awards nomination as Best Supporting Actor in a Feature Film for his role as Ronald in Ryan Kruger's cult-hit Fried Barry. The SAFTAS is the South African equivalent of the American Oscars or British BAFTAS.

The character actor began his career in 1993, playing the role of Thomas in an adaptation of The Gospel According to Matthew. In 1996, he also had a recurring role on Egoli: Place of Gold, a long-running South African soap opera.

Michael's first significant American television role was in 2005 when he landed the support lead in Dean Devlin's mini-series The Triangle. Also, in 2008 he joined the cast of 24 playing French UN worker, Charles Solenz, in 24: Redemption. The New York Post singled out Michael's performance saying that his character "might be the most spineless, loathsome character ever created for this show."
 
In 2011, Michael portrayed the role of Thomas Edison in History Channel's series America: The Story of Us, scoring the highest viewership ratings in network history.

The following year, he played the lead in Animal Planet's TV special Mermaids: The Body Found, which scored the highest viewership ratings for the channel since 2003. He appeared in HBO's film The Girl and the Strike Back series. He also worked opposite Denzel Washington and Ryan Reynolds in Universal's Safe House. In 2013, he starred opposite the late Oscar winner William Hurt in BBC Films' Royal Television Society's film, The Challenger, about the space shuttle disaster. He then started work on season 1 of Black Sails. The show received several Emmy Awards. The second season premiered on January 24, 2015. Michael was considered for Emmy and SAG awards for his work on season one and two as series regular Richard Guthrie.
 
In 2015, he played the supporting role of Lester in the film The Salvation, for director Kristian Levring, and starring Mads Mikkelsen, Eva Green and Jonathan Pryce. The Danish western premiered at Cannes to a ten-minute standing ovation.

In 2016, Michael guest starred in a number of US television shows, including Of Kings and Prophets (ABC), Criminal Minds: Beyond Borders (CBS) and Scorpion (CBS)  in which he played the lead baddie, Shane Copley and once again was considered for an Emmy.

In 2017, he recurred as Russian diplomat Grigory Krukov in USA's hit conspiracy drama Shooter and as Old Man Heart in Syfy's Blood Drive

Michael also plays the lead role in the sci-fi short film "Tears in the Rain" which screened at the Boston SciFi Film Festival  and won him the Jury and Audience Best Actor Award at the SciFi Underground Film Festival in Munich, Germany.

The actor was next seen as the main protagonist, Sam in director Christopher-Lee Dos Santos' indie feature "Last Broken Darkness". Michael won Best Performance by an Actor in a Feature Film for this role at the Boston SciFi Film Festival (2017).

In 2018, he guest starred as The Ghost (Connor) on CBS' MacGyver (2016 TV series) and was considered for an Emmy nomination for his portrayal.

Michael's next project was the political thriller The Last Victims (2019 film) for director Maynard Kraak. Its Hollywood premiere was at the Pan African Film Festival in February 2019, and then opened the Rapid Lion (South African International Film Festival) on 1 March 2019, where Michael was nominated for Best Actor in a Leading Role. Michael then went on to win Best Lead Actor in a Feature Film at the South Film and Arts Academy Festival in Chile.

In 2019 the busy actor recurred on Deep State (TV series) on Fox and Epix as Colonel John Russell, as well as "The Devil Speaks" and "Die Spreeus" for Kyknet, while in 2020 he starred in the multi award-winning cult indie film Fried Barry, "Triggered" (Samuel Goldwyn Films), The Last Days of American Crime (Netflix), "A Boere-Krismis" (Mnet), as well as "Vagrant Queen" (SyFy), "MariTeam" for Germany and "The Cars that made the World" (History).

In 2021 Michael was seen in the Netflix original feature "Angeliena" and guest starred in "Die Boekklub". He also starred in short films "Stay Safe" and "A Moment".

In 2022 he was seen opposite David Tennant in "Around the World in 80 Days" for the BBC and as a series regular in "Die Byl" for Kyknet (South Africa) and "Ludik" for Netflix.

This year Michael can be seen recurring on "Catch Me a Killer" on Mnet and Showmax as legendary FBI profiler Robert Ressler. He is also attached as a lead in the "A.S.T." film franchise in which he will play Gideon, the powerful leader of a black bag operation for the CIA.  Michael also serves as co-writer and executive producer in the Netflix Original feature "Collision".

Filmography

Film

Television

References

External links
 

1969 births
Living people
20th-century South African male actors
21st-century South African male actors
South African people of British descent
White South African people
Male actors from Cape Town
South African male child actors
South African male film actors
South African male television actors
South African male musical theatre actors